Ungmennafélag Álftaness, also known as Álftanes, is a multi-sports club in Álftanes, Iceland. It has active departments in basketball, football, golf, track and field and volleyball.

History
The club was founded in 1946 as Ungmennafélag Bessastaðahrepps. In 2004 it changed its name to Ungmennafélag Álftaness, or Álftanes for short.

Home court
The home court of the club is Íþróttamiðstöð Álftaness. Its indoor arena is commonly known as Forsetahöllin (English: The President's Palace) while its football field is known as the Forsetavöllurinn (English: The President's field).

Basketball

Men's basketball

Recent history

2017-2018
On April 8, 2018, Álftanes star player, Kjartan Atli Kjartansson, hit a go-ahead three-pointer in the waning seconds of its game against Stál-úlfur in the 3. deild karla semi-finals, helping them to victory and promotion to 2. deild karla. In the finals, Álftanes beat Vestri-b for the 3. deild championship.

2018-2019
On July 20, 2018, the club hired Hrafn Kristjánsson, who guided KR to the national championship in 2011, as its head coach. On 17 September 2018, it was reported that former 1. deild karla scoring champion and two-time Icelandic Cup winner, Marvin Valdimarsson, had signed with the team. They started the 2. deild season with a bang, thrashing former 1. deild karla club Körfuknattleiksfélag ÍA with 64 points, 136–72. On 16 April 2019, Álftanes defeated ÍA in the 2. deild karla finals, 123–100, and achieved promotion to the 1. deild karla.

2019-2020
On 12 June 2019, Álftanes signed Úrvalsdeild karla all-time leader in assists, Justin Shouse. On 22 July 2019, the team signed former 1. deild karla scoring champion Samuel Prescott Jr. On 16 August 2019, the team signed former Úrvalsdeild players Birgir Björn Pétursson and Þorsteinn Finnbogason. Two days later, the team signed 6-time national champion Vilhjálmur Kári Jensson from KR.

2020-2021
On 2 October 2021, forward Þorsteinn Finnbogason scored 10 three pointers for Álftanes in a victory against Vestri. The team finished fifth in the league with a 9–7 record and bowed out in the first round of the promotion playoffs against Skallagrímur.

2021-2022
On 4 January 2022, the team signed Sinisa Bilic who had started the season with Breiðablik and played in the Úrvalsdeild since 2019. Following Álftanes' loss against Höttur in the 1. deild promotion playoffs in April 2022, head coach Hrafn Kristjánsson announced his retirement from coaching.

2022-2023
In May 2022, Kjartan Atli Kjartansson was hired as the head coach of the men's team.

Trophies and achievements
1. deild karla
 Winners: 2023
2. deild karla
 Winners: 2019
 Runner-up: 2014
3. deild karla
 Winners: 2018

Awards

1. deild karla Domestic All-First Team
Róbert Sigurðsson – 2021

Coaches
 Hrafn Kristjánsson 2018–2022
 Kjartan Atli Kjartansson 2022–present

Notable players
 Birgir Björn Pétursson
 Kjartan Atli Kjartansson
 Marvin Valdimarsson

Recent seasons

Notes1 The team had secured a spot in the playoffs when the season was canceled due to the coronavirus pandemic in Iceland.
Source

Football

Men's football
Álftanes men's football team plays in 4. deild karla as of 2021.

Trophies and achievements
4. deild karla
 Winners: 2014

Women's football
Álftanes women's football team plays in 2. deild kvenna as of 2021.

References

External links
 Álftanes profile at Icelandic Basketball Federation
 Álftanes profile at Football Association of Iceland

Basketball teams in Iceland
Football clubs in Iceland